The Pulitzer Prize for Drama is one of the seven American Pulitzer Prizes that are annually awarded for Letters, Drama, and Music. It is one of the original Pulitzers, for the program was inaugurated in 1917 with seven prizes, four of which were awarded that year. (No Drama prize was given, however, so that one was inaugurated in 1918, in a sense.) It recognizes a theatrical work staged in the U.S. during the preceding calendar year.

Until 2007, eligibility for the Drama Prize ran from March 1 to March 2 to reflect the Broadway "season" rather than the calendar year that governed most other Pulitzer Prizes. 

The drama jury, which consists of one academic and four critics, attends plays in New York and in regional theaters. The Pulitzer board can overrule the jury's choice; in 1986, the board's opposition to the jury's choice of the CIVIL warS resulted in no award being given. 

The 1951 prize was to go to Frank Loesser, Jo Swerling and Abe Burrows' musical Guys and Dolls, but was vetoed by the Trustees of Columbia University due to Burrows' communist sympathies, and no award was given. In 1955 Joseph Pulitzer, Jr. pressured the prize jury into presenting the Prize to Cat on a Hot Tin Roof, which the jury considered the weakest of the five shortlisted nominees ("amateurishly constructed... from the stylistic points of view annoyingly pretentious"), instead of Clifford Odets' The Flowering Peach (their preferred choice) or The Bad Seed, their second choice. Edward Albee's  Who's Afraid of Virginia Woolf? was selected for the 1963 Pulitzer Prize for Drama by that award's committee.  However, the committee's selection was overruled by the award's advisory board, the trustees of Columbia University, because of the play's then-controversial use of profanity and sexual themes.  Had Albee been awarded, he would be tied with Eugene O'Neill for the most Pulitzer Prizes for Drama (four).

Awards and nominations
In its first 106 years to 2022, the Drama Pulitzer was awarded 91 times; none were given in 15 years and it was never split.

The most recipients of the prize in one year was five, when Michael Bennett, James Kirkwood, Jr., Nicholas Dante, Marvin Hamlisch, and Edward Kleban shared the 1976 prize for the musical A Chorus Line.

Notes
† marks winners of the Tony Award for Best Play.

* marks winners of the Tony Award for Best Musical.

≠ marks nominees of the Tony Award for Best Play or the Tony Award for Best Musical

1910s

1920s

1930s

1940s

1950s

1960s

1970s

1980s

1990s

2000s

2010s

2020s

Musicals 
Ten musicals have won the Pulitzer Prize for Drama, roughly one per decade from the 1930s to the 2020s¹. They are: George and Ira Gershwin's Of Thee I Sing (1932), Rodgers and Hammerstein's South Pacific (1950), Bock & Harnick's Fiorello! (1960), Frank Loesser's How to Succeed in Business Without Really Trying (1962), Marvin Hamlisch, Edward Kleban, James Kirkwood, Jr., and Nicholas Dante's A Chorus Line (1976), Stephen Sondheim's and James Lapine's Sunday in the Park with George (1985), Jonathan Larson's Rent (1996), Brian Yorkey and Tom Kitt's Next to Normal (2010), Lin-Manuel Miranda's Hamilton (2016), and Michael R. Jackson's A Strange Loop (2020). Though it did not win for Drama, Oklahoma! was awarded a special Pulitzer Prize in 1944.

Of note, South Pacific won the 1950 Pulitzer for Drama but its source material, James Michener's Tales of the South Pacific, also won the 1948 Pulitzer Prize for Fiction.

Sunday in the Park with George and Next to Normal are the only musicals that won the Pulitzer Prize and did not also win the Tony Award for Best Musical; the latter won the authors Tonys for Best Original Score and Best Orchestrations. Of Thee I Sing opened before the Tony Awards existed.

The award goes to the playwright, although production of the play is also taken into account.  In the case of a musical being awarded the prize, the composer, lyricist and book writer are generally the recipients.  An exception to this was the first Pulitzer ever awarded to a musical: when Of Thee I Sing won in 1932, book authors George S. Kaufman and Morrie Ryskind, as well as lyricist Ira Gershwin, were cited as the winners, while composer George Gershwin's contribution was overlooked by the committee.  The reason given was that the Pulitzer Prize for Drama is a dramatic award, and not a musical one.  However, by 1950 the Pulitzer committee included composer Richard Rodgers as a recipient when South Pacific won the award, in recognition of music as an integral and important part of the theatrical experience.

Additionally, since 1983, when the identity of finalists was first disclosed, five musicals have been finalists for the Pulitzer Prize for Drama. They are: Lee Breuer and Bob Telson's The Gospel at Colonus (1985); Lin-Manuel Miranda and Quiara Alegría Hudes' In the Heights (2009); Jeanine Tesori and Lisa Kron's Fun Home (2014); Taylor Mac's A 24-Decade History of Popular Music (2017); and David Henry Hwang and Jeanine Tesori's Soft Power (2020).

¹All listed dates are Prize years. Generally, the musical in question opened in New York during either the preceding calendar year or the preceding Broadway season.

Multiple wins and nominations

The following individuals received two or more Pulitzer Prizes for Drama:

The following individuals received two or more nominations:

Lynn Nottage is the only female playwright to win the prize twice. She and August Wilson are the only playwrights of color to accomplish this feat.

Jon Robin Baitz, Gina Gionfriddo, John Guare, A.R. Gurney, Richard Greenberg, Tina Howe, Branden Jacobs-Jenkins, Stephen Karam, Sarah Ruhl and Jeanine Tesori have each been named finalists twice without winning.  David Henry Hwang is the only person to have been named a finalist thrice without winning.   Lin-Manuel Miranda and Jeanine Tesori are the only people to be named as a finalist twice for writing and composing a musical, with Miranda winning in 2016.

References

External links

 

Drama
American literary awards
American theater awards
Dramatist and playwright awards
Awards established in 1918